WMYS-LD (channel 69) is a low-power television station in South Bend, Indiana, United States, affiliated with MyNetworkTV. It is owned by Weigel Broadcasting (as the company's only MyNetworkTV affiliate), and is sister to ABC affiliate WBND-LD (channel 57) and CW affiliate WCWW-LD (channel 25). The stations share studios on Generations Drive (near the Indiana Toll Road) in northeastern South Bend, while WMYS-LD's transmitter is located just off the St. Joseph Valley Parkway on the city's south side.

Due to its low-power status, its broadcasting radius only covers the immediate South Bend area. Therefore, Weigel relies on paid television subscription carriage for all three of its South Bend television stations to reach the entire market.

History
The station first signed on the air on December 2, 1987, as W12BK, broadcasting on VHF channel 12; later that month, it moved to UHF channel 69 and accordingly changed its calls to W69BT. It originally operated as a translator of Chicago sister station WCIU-TV, which at the time was an independent station with Telemundo as a secondary affiliation. On October 18, 1995, W58BT (channel 58, now WBND-LD on channel 57) became the South Bend market's new ABC affiliate, after full-power WSJV (channel 28) ended its affiliation with that network to join Fox. Due to W58BT's low-power signal which could not reach the entire market, Weigel then converted W69BT into a translator of W58BT to reach areas that could not receive an adequate signal as Weigel campaigned the FCC to increase the station's signal radius, along with establishing its pay-TV coverage.

After several years, those efforts were successful. As most of the market could receive channel 57 without issue, in October 1999, channel 69 became an affiliate of The WB with its own schedule. The station's callsign was changed to WMWB-LP (standing for "Michiana's WB").

After Weigel purchased WYGN-LP (channel 25, now CW affiliate WCWW-LD) in 2002 from 3ABN, Weigel chose to move channel 69's schedule, call letters, and WB affiliation to that station, which was closer to the majority of the channels on the South Bend television dial. Channel 69 then adopted channel 25's former WRDY-LP call letters. It later changed its calls three more times: first to WAAT-LP in 2004, then briefly to WCWW-LP in March 2006. From 2002 until 2004, it was once again simulcasting ABC programming from WBND-LP; after that, it returned to being an independent station, with occasional programming from the Sportsman Channel.

In March 2006, Weigel reached an affiliation deal to affiliate channel 69 with MyNetworkTV, a network launched as a partnership between Fox Television Stations and Twentieth Television; in accordance to the new affiliation, it changed its calls to WMYT-LP before modifying it to WMYS-LP in April 2006. WMYS affiliated with MyNetworkTV when it launched on September 5, 2006. Until 2011, when MeTV launched on WBND-LD2, the station carried classic television series and retro commercials associated with MeTV's stations in Chicago, though without the branding due to its network affiliation and a sizeable amount of recent first-run programming within the station's schedule. Currently it carries a sizable amount of current-day programming, though it retains The Andy Griffith Show. From 2015 and 2019, it carried Cubs and White Sox games broadcast by WGN-TV in Chicago.

In early August 2008, Weigel Broadcasting agreed to sell all three of its South Bend stations, including WMYS, to Schurz Communications, the longtime owner of the local CBS affiliate WSBT-TV, for undisclosed terms. However, in the absence of action by the Federal Communications Commission (FCC), the deal was called off in August 2009.

Programming
Syndicated programming featured on the station includes The Doctors, Judge Jerry, Mike & Molly, Pawn Stars, Monk and The Andy Griffith Show among others.

Technical information

Subchannels
The station's digital signal is multiplexed:

Analog-to-digital conversion
On September 14, 2007, WMYS and its sister stations began low-power digital broadcasts. On November 30, 2010, WMYS turned off its analog signal on channel 69 because of a power supply failure, although the station remained available on its digital companion signal and on digital cable. The station had a construction permit obtained by the FCC to move its analog signal to UHF channel 34, since channel 69 is an out-of-core allotment for post-digital transition television broadcasting and low-power television stations are currently under no obligation to cease analog broadcasts. On April 16, 2012, the FCC granted a construction permit for WMYS-LD to move its digital frequency from channel 23 to channel 34 (its former proposed analog allotment and formerly occupied by the analog signal of WNIT). On August 19, WMYS-LD swapped digital frequencies with WBND-LD, with WMYS taking WBND's proposed channel 39 allotment and WBND taking the channel 34 allotment. On August 29, 2018, WMYS moved from channel 39 to channel 33.On October 18, 2019, WMYS moved from channel 33 to channel 28 (its former proposed analog allotment and formerly occupied by the analog signal of WSJV).

References

External links
Official website

Weigel Broadcasting
MyNetworkTV affiliates
Decades (TV network) affiliates
Low-power television stations in the United States
Spanish-language television stations in Indiana
MYS-LD
Television channels and stations established in 1987
1987 establishments in Indiana
Telemundo network affiliates